Allahabad–Jhansi Graduates constituency is one of 100 Legislative Council seats in Uttar Pradesh. The districts of Prayagraj, Jhansi, Fatehpur, Hamirpur, Jalaun, Kaushambi, Banda, Lalitpur, Chitrakoot and Mahoba fall within the legislature of this constituency. Dr Man Singh Yadav of the Samajwadi Party is the incumbent MLC in the Uttar Pradesh Legislative Council.

Member of Legislative Council

See also
Allahabad (Lok Sabha constituency)
Jhansi Nagar (Assembly constituency)
Jhansi (Lok Sabha constituency)

References

Uttar Pradesh Legislative Council
Graduates constituencies in India